Euxesta sororcula is a species of ulidiid or picture-winged fly in the genus Euxesta of the family Ulidiidae. Its distribution is in Central and South America. It feeds on foliage of the genus Zea.

References

sororcula
Insects described in 1830